Paul Machliss (born 1972) is an Australian film and television editor. He has worked on TV series such as Black Books and The IT Crowd, as well as on Edgar Wright's television series Spaced and feature films Scott Pilgrim vs. the World (2010), The World's End (2013), and Baby Driver (2017).

Early life and career 
Machliss was born in Melbourne, Victoria, Australia, and is a graduate of Brighton Secondary College. He got his start working as a gofer on Fast Forward, an Australian sketch comedy series. He went to work in a post-production facility, serving as a videotape librarian and operator. While at this job, Machliss taught himself how to use the company's editing suite, allowing him to get a job editing advertisements and corporate videos. He then worked freelance on a trade show in Amsterdam, after which he relocated to the UK and worked as an online editor for several post-production facilities. From there, he was hired as a freelance editor to work on British television series, including Spaced and Black Books. His work on these series got him a job editing Scott Pilgrim vs. the World, directed by Edgar Wright, in 2010. In 2013, he served as the editor for The World's End, also directed by Wright.

Filmography 
Credits adapted from Machliss' agency website.

Film

Television

References

Further reading

External links 
 

1972 births
Living people
Year of birth uncertain
Australian film editors
Best Editing BAFTA Award winners